Scoring more than 1,000 runs in T20I format of cricket is considered a significant achievement. on 23 June 2011, England batter Charlotte Edwards became the first woman to score 1,000 runs in WT20I. Later in 2014, she also became the first female player to cross the 2,000 run milestone as well and first player (either male or female) to cross 2500 runs. She retired as the most prolific run scorer in Women's Twenty20 International (WT20Is), with a total of 2605 runs in March 2016. She remained as leading run-scoorer (either male or female) for another more than 2 years until it was broken by Suzie Bates of New Zealand in June 2018. Suzie became the first player (either male or female) to score 3000 runs in T20 Internationals as well.

In terms of innings, Charlotte Edwards is the fastest (35) to reach the 1,000 run mark, whereas Pakistan's Nida Dar is the slowest (83) to reach the mark. Ellyse Perry is the first player (either male or female) who has scored 1,000+ runs and taken 100+ wickets in Twenty20 Internationals. . , 35 players from 9 teams that are Full Members of the International Cricket Council (ICC) have scored 1,000 runs in T20Is. Out of these 35 players, 7 players are from England followed by Australia (6 players).

This list contains all the players who have scored 1,000 runs in T20I. By default the list is sorted in order of the day the feat is achieved. Overall career scores of these players will be updated on regular interval and not on daily basis.

Key

Players with 1,000 or more T20I runs
Player list and statistics are updated as of 18 August 2022.

See also
 Women's Twenty20 International

References

Women's cricket-related lists
Women's Twenty20 International cricket records and statistics